The seventh season of the American television medical drama Grey's Anatomy, began airing on September 23, 2010 on the American Broadcasting Company (ABC), and concluded on May 19, 2011 ending the season with a total of 22 episodes.  The season was produced by ABC Studios, in association with Shondaland Production Company and The Mark Gordon Company; the showrunner being Shonda Rhimes and head writer Krista Vernoff.

The season follows the aftermath of the season 6 shooting, in which Derek Shepherd (Patrick Dempsey), Alex Karev (Justin Chambers) Reed, and Charles are shot, and a total of 11 people died. Cristina Yang (Sandra Oh) was the most affected by the shooting, quitting her job. Cristina and Owen later marry with "her person", the show's protagonist Meredith Grey (Ellen Pompeo), as her maid of honor. Meredith and Derek start an Alzheimer trial, with Meredith suspecting that Richard Webber's (James Pickens, Jr.) wife Adele (Loretta Devine) may have Alzheimer's. Arizona Robbins (Jessica Capshaw) leaves for Africa after getting a grant leaving Callie Torres (Sara Ramirez) despondent. She sleeps with Mark Sloan (Eric Dane) and becomes pregnant by chance. Arizona returns, confessing her love for Callie. Meredith messes up the trial for the sake of Adele only to have Alex find out and tell Hunt, leading to Meredith kicking him out of her house. Derek leaves Meredith with Zola. Lexie Grey (Chyler Leigh) decides to give Mark a second chance but later starts a relationship with Jackson Avery (Jesse Williams). Teddy Altman (Kim Raver) starts a relationship with Andrew Perkins (James Tupper), a trauma counselor, but later falls for her patient, Henry Burton. This season marks the first appearance of Caterina Scorsone as Derek's sister, Dr. Amelia Shepherd, who becomes a series regular in season 11.

The season ended with an average of 11.41 million viewers and was ranked #31 in overall viewership and was #9 in the 18-49 key demographic. Loretta Devine won the Outstanding Guest Actress in a Drama at the 63rd Primetime Emmy Awards. The season also garnered 7 nominations at the 37th People's Choice Awards and also won the Outstanding Drama Series at the NAACP Image Awards.

Episodes 

The number in the "No. in series" column refers to the episode's number within the overall series, whereas the number in the "No. in season" column refers to the episode's number within this particular season. "U.S. viewers in millions" refers to the number of Americans in millions who watched the episodes live. Each episode of this season is named after a song.

Cast and characters

Main 
 Ellen Pompeo as Dr. Meredith Grey
 Sandra Oh as Dr. Cristina Yang
 Justin Chambers as Dr. Alex Karev
 Chandra Wilson as Dr. Miranda Bailey
 James Pickens, Jr. as Dr. Richard Webber
 Sara Ramirez as Dr. Callie Torres
 Eric Dane as Dr. Mark Sloan
 Chyler Leigh as Dr. Lexie Grey
 Kevin McKidd as Dr. Owen Hunt
 Jessica Capshaw as Dr. Arizona Robbins
 Kim Raver as Dr. Teddy Altman
 Sarah Drew as Dr. April Kepner
 Jesse Williams as Dr. Jackson Avery
 Patrick Dempsey as Dr. Derek Shepherd

Recurring 
 James Tupper as Dr. Andrew Perkins
 Rachael Taylor as Dr. Lucy Fields
 Peter MacNicol as Dr. Robert Stark
 Scott Foley as Henry Burton
 Daniel Sunjata as Nurse Eli
 Loretta Devine as Adele Webber
 Jeff Perry as Thatcher Grey
 Nicole Cummins as Paramedic Nicole

Notable guests 
 Kate Walsh as Dr. Addison Montgomery
 Caterina Scorsone as Dr. Amelia Shepherd
 Jason George as Dr. Ben Warren
 Mark Saul as Dr. Steve Mastow
 Mandy Moore as Mary Portman
 Ryan Devlin as Bill Portman
 Frances Conroy as Eleanor
 Diane Farr as Laila
 Héctor Elizondo as Carlos Torres 
 Debra Mooney as Evelyn Hunt 
 Amanda Foreman as Nora
 Amber Benson as Corrine Henley
 Jamie Chung as Trina
 Steven W. Bailey as Joe, the Bartender 
 Adam Busch as an Fred Wilson
 Marina Sirtis as Sonya
 Nancy Travis as Allison Baker
 L. Scott Caldwell as Alison
 Wilmer Calderon as Raul Aranda 
 Toni Torres as Annette Aranda 
 Anthony Keyvan as Miguel Aranda  
 Amber Stevens as Laurel Pinson
 Candice Patton as Meg Waylon
 Doris Roberts as Gladys

Reception

Ratings

Live + SD ratings

Live + 7 Day (DVR) ratings

Critical response 
The reviews to the season were mixed-to-positive. Robert Bianco USA Today gave a largely positive review stating, "Happily, it now seems to have landed on solid ground, with its best ensemble and most engaging stories in years, the union of Meredith and Derek strengthened it by pushing them into a more mature place", and praising Sandra Oh's performance:" Cristina, who responded last week with a performance that stands with any you're likely to see."

The TV Addict also lauded the season and wrote, "the seventh season of ABC’s genre-defining medical drama is good. Is it "great again"? This would imply that it was great before, a memory I wish I could fondly look back on, but can’t. I’ll admit to have been taken with the doctors of Seattle Grace in their initial seasons: they had chemistry, gave some nice performances", praising the majority cast including Oh's "powerful performance".

Jennifer Armstrong of Entertainment Weekly also praised the season, "Season 7 hasn't relegated the finale's events to a dramatic stunt; rather, it's reveled in the possibilities of rebuilding life in the wake of tragedy." She added "It's in the shooting's emotional reverberations that the show is regenerating after the past few hit-and-miss seasons."

Tom Gliatto writing for People Weekly called the season "satisfying", "Grey has been on long enough now that it has lost much of its erotic sizzle--McDreamy is edging toward McNappy--but the satisfyingly-steady seventh season is a model of a hit that keeps fitting new characters into the blueprint."

Renee Scolaro Rathke of PopMatters, reviewing the premiere, gave a mixed review, "Unfortunately, the best bits of the premiere were the flashbacks to the finale, though their impact was watered down considerably in the context of an action-less storyline, filled with Grey's usual rambling pontifications." Verne Gay of Newsday was rather critical of the season stating, "Unfortunately, they've settled on far-too-easy and facile answers for the most part."

DVD release

References 

2010 American television seasons
2011 American television seasons
Grey's Anatomy seasons